Elachista bengtssoni is a moth of the family Elachistidae that is endemic to Spain.

References

bengtssoni
Moths described in 1992
Endemic fauna of Spain
Moths of Europe